The Jiusan Society is one of the eight legally recognised minor political parties in the People's Republic of China under the direction of the Chinese Communist Party.

The party's original name was "Democracy and Science Forum" on its informal founding in 1944; the current name refers to the date of Chinese victory in the Second Sino-Japanese War (3 September 1945). The party is a member of the Chinese People's Political Consultative Conference.

The party's mission statement is to "lead the nation to power and the people to prosperity". The party's main focus is scientific and educational development. The party had a membership of 183,710 members by 2019, mostly high- and medium-level intellectuals in the fields of science, technology, and education.

Out of all legally recognised minor political parties in the People's Republic of China, the Jiusan Society have the largest number of seats in the National People's Congress at 64 seats.

Chairpersons 
 Xu Deheng, 1946–1987
 Zhou Peiyuan, 1987–1992
 Wu Jieping, 1992–2002
 Han Qide, 2002–2017
 Wu Weihua, 2017–present

References

External links 
 

 
Socialist parties in China
Political parties in China
1945 establishments in China
Political parties established in 1945
Organizations associated with the Chinese Communist Party